Microtubule-associated protein 4 is a protein that in humans is encoded by the MAP4 gene.

The protein encoded by this gene is a major non-neuronal microtubule-associated protein. This protein contains a domain similar to the microtubule-binding domains of neuronal microtubule-associated protein (MAP2) and microtubule-associated protein tau (MAPT/TAU). This protein promotes microtubule assembly, and has been shown to counteract destabilization of interphase microtubule catastrophe promotion. Cyclin B was found to interact with this protein, which targets cell division cycle 2 (CDC2) kinase to microtubules. The phosphorylation of this protein affects microtubule properties and cell cycle progression. Multiple alternatively spliced transcript variants encoding distinct isoforms have been observed, the full-length nature of three of which are supported.
uMAP4, the ubiquitous isoform of MAP4, functions in the architecture and positioning of the mitotic spindle in human cells. oMAP4 is predominantly expressed in brain and muscle and has been shown to organise microtubules into antiparallel bundles. mMAP4 is a muscle-specific isoform.

References

Further reading